Good Bye Lenin! is the original soundtrack album of the film of the same title starring Daniel Brühl and Katrin Sass.
The music is composed by Yann Tiersen, with the exception of the non-instrumental version of "Summer 78" sung by Claire Pichet.
This album has been released with the Copy Control protection system in some regions.

Analysis
Parts of the soundtrack are reminiscent of Yann Tiersen's best known film work, the soundtrack for Amélie, which was in turn strongly influenced by French music. In fact, one of the songs on Amélie, "Comptine d'un autre été : L'après-midi", was also used on Good bye, Lenin! during the scene of the family's first East-West Berlin outing, although it does not appear on the soundtrack album.

Reception

Track listing
All songs written by Yann Tiersen

Personnel
Adapted from album liner notes.

 Noémie Airiau - Violin
 Stéphane Avenas - Direction
 Emmanuel Bacquet - Photography
 Jean Noël Bériat - Double Bass
 Laurent Bernard - Bassoon
 Guillaume Bourgogne - Conductor
 Marie Elsa Bretagne - Viola
 Daniel Chambard - Tuba
 Muriel Charbonnier - Violin
 Myriam Constans - Oboe
 Sylvie Dalmais - Violin
 Sabine Dubosc - Cello
 Dominique Eudeline - Flute
 Marc Guérolt - Studio Assistant
 Michel Herbaux - Trumpet
 Conny Klein - Photography
 Moïra Le Luron Kressmann - Violin
 Nadia Kuentz - Violin
 Martin Kukula - Photography
 Valerie Delhomme Lavigne - Cello
 Valérie Lewandowski - Piccolo
 Sissie Lhoumeau - Violin
 Annabelle Luis - Cello
 Béatrice Meunier - Violin
 Irène Nazarian - Violin
 Pierre Perosino Gravallon - Vibraphone
 Sophie Perrot - Violin
 Claire Pichet - Vocals
 Sylvie Pinsello - Violin
 Dirk Plamböck - Photography
 Didier Reymond - Bass Clarinet
 Isabelle Reynaud - Violin
 Geneviève Rigot - Viola
 Isabelle Salelles - Violin
 Anne Sophie Siméand - Viola
 Lelia Stahl - Violin
 Andro Steinborn - Music Coordinator
 Yann Tiersen - Composer
 Pascal Torgue - Trombone
 Céline Traversaz - Viola
 Uliyana Vaccani - Viola
 Anne Laure Verne - Violin
 Jean Marie Verne - Double Bass
 Pascale Verne - Violin
 Emmanuel Villemaux - Violin

Charts

References

Yann Tiersen albums
2003 soundtrack albums
EMI Records soundtracks
Comedy film soundtracks